Patrick Earl O'Connor (born 17 September 1966 in St. Catherine) is a retired Jamaican sprinter who specialized in the 400 metres. He won a bronze medal in 4 × 400 metres relay at the 1991 World Championships, together with teammates Seymour Fagan, Devon Morris and Winthrop Graham.

International competitions

References

1966 births
Living people
Jamaican male sprinters
People from Saint Catherine Parish
Olympic athletes of Jamaica
Athletes (track and field) at the 1992 Summer Olympics
Pan American Games bronze medalists for Jamaica
Pan American Games medalists in athletics (track and field)
Athletes (track and field) at the 1991 Pan American Games
Universiade medalists in athletics (track and field)
Goodwill Games medalists in athletics
Universiade gold medalists for Jamaica
Universiade gold medalists in athletics (track and field)
World Athletics Championships athletes for Jamaica
World Athletics Championships medalists
Competitors at the 1990 Goodwill Games
Medalists at the 1991 Pan American Games
20th-century Jamaican people
21st-century Jamaican people